The Roznovanu Palace or Roset-Roznovanu Palace ( or ) is an edifice located in Iași, Romania. It was built in the second half of the 18th century, and rebuilt between 1830 and 1833, by Iordache Ruset-Roznovanu, a member of the Rosetti family. During World War I, it hosted the Romanian government. Today, it hosts the Iași City Hall. 

The Roset-Roznovanu Palace is listed in the National Register of Historic Monuments.

References

External links

Roset-Roznovanu Palace History 

Historic monuments in Iași County
Buildings and structures in Iași
City and town halls in Romania